Sidique is a surname. Notable persons with that name include:

 Sidique Mansaray (born 1980), Sierra Leonean footballer
 Sidique Mussagi (born 1993), Mozambican footballer
 Sidique Ali Merican (1930–2009), Malaysian sprinter
 Mohammad Sidique Khan (1974–2005), Suicide bomber

See also
 Siddique (disambiguation)

Arabic masculine given names